William Porter (died 1436) of Wimpole, Cambridgeshire, was an English politician.

Family
Porter was the son of Reynold Porter of Rutland. By December 1411, Porter had married Agnes (c. 1387 – 4 March 1461), daughter and coheiress of Sir Adam Francis, MP.

Career
He was a Member (MP) of the Parliament of England for Cambridgeshire in May 1413.

References

English MPs May 1413
People from Wimpole
1436 deaths
Year of birth unknown